Homoranthus biflorus is a flowering plant in the  family Myrtaceae and is endemic to a small area in northern New South Wales. It is an erect shrub with cylinder-shaped leaves and small groups of usually yellow flowers.

Description
It has glabrous, linear, more or less cylinder-shaped leaves with a pointed tip. Flowers and fruits sporadically throughout the year , although primarily between October and January.

Taxonomy and naming
Homoranthus biflorus was first formally described in 1991 by Lyndley Craven and S.R.Jones and the description was published in Australian Systematic Botany.The specific epithet (biflorus) means "two flowered".

Distribution and habitat
This homoranthus grows in heath and woodland on volcanic ridges on the Northern Tablelands of New South Wales.

Conservation status
Locally common though restricted in distribution, Barbara Briggs and John Leigh (1996) gave this species a conservation code of 2RCat;. However 2RC is more appropriate given that some plants near Pindarri Dam are unreserved.

References

External links
 The Australasian Virtual Herbarium – Occurrence data for Homoranthus biflorus

biflorus
Flora of New South Wales
Myrtales of Australia
Plants described in 1991